Pumlenpat is the second largest lake in Manipur after the Loktak Lake, situated about  south of Imphal (the capital of Manipur, a state in North East India) and about  from Thoubal. Just as Loktak Lake, People situated around this lake depend on fishery products for their livelihood. The lake plays an important role in lives of the towns nearby.  There are plenty of small islands on this lake; people started settling on these islands, and the lake is now on the verge of extinction due to human encroachment.

Barrages
Ithai barrage or dam, one of the important dams related to the Loktak Lift Irrigation is situated at southwest corner of this lake.

Extinction
Pumlen lake or Pumlenpat is on the verge of extinction due to human settlement and encroachments in and around this lake. The floating planktons, or phumdi as it is called locally, is one of the important source of fishery products as waterbodies and the fishes can easily get adapted to this place for food and shelter.

See also
 Ikop Pat
 Loktak lake

References 

 http://kanglaonline.com/2015/06/protest-against-proposed-sangai-translocation-to-pumlen-pat-continues
 http://www.thehindu.com/sci-tech/energy-and-environment/manipur-to-translocate-critically-endangered-sangai-deer/article7321501.ece
 http://thepeopleschronicle.in/?p=12821
 http://www.thesangaiexpress.com/pumlen-pat-opposes

Imphal
Lakes of Manipur